The 2016 Oceania Weightlifting Championships was held in Suva, Fiji between May 24 and May 28, 2016.

Medal summary
Results shown below are for the senior competition only. Junior and youth results are cited here and here respectively.

Men

Women

Medal table 
Ranking by Big (Total result) medals

Participating nations 

 (6)
 (17)
 (3)
 (24)
 (1)
 (1)
 (6)
 (2)
 (2)

 (2)
 (17)
 (36)
 (1)
 (3)
 (15)
 (8)
 (1)
 (8)

References

External links
 Senior results book
 Junior results book
 Youth results book

Oceania Weightlifting Championships
Oceania Weightlifting Championships
International sports competitions hosted by Fiji
Sport in Suva
Weightlifting competitions in Fiji
Oceania Weightlifting Championships